Joseph Gott (1785–1860) was a 19th century British sculptor. His terracotta groups and animal and children pieces were very popular in the 1830s.

Life

He was born at Calverley near Leeds in 1785 the son of industrialist Benjamin Gott, a woollen manufacturer in Leeds and Mayor of Leeds from 1799. Joseph was baptised on 11 December 1785 in London. Unlike his brothers he did not join the family business of Gott & Sons. He was apprenticed to the eminent sculptor John Flaxman in London from 1798 to 1802. He joined the Royal Academy Schools in 1805. He received patronage from his rich cousin Benjamin Gott and also George Banks a wealthy Yorkshireman.

In 1822 Sir Thomas Lawrence gave him a letter of introduction to Antonio Canova in Rome. He did not take this trip immediately and only in 1824 did his father agree to underwrite the cost of his travel and accommodation in Rome. Thereafter he spent most of his remaining life in Rome. His most successful period ended abruptly in 1838 when the cholera epidemic brought an abrupt end to the usually steady stream of British tourists going to Italy on the grand tour. Not only this, the epidemic killed his children, and his wife's memory was destroyed by the disease. Gott ceased working in 1845 and went into a long depression.

In his early years in Rome he spent some time with young Joseph Severn. From 1828 until death Gott lived in a large apartment at 155 Via Babuino in Rome (this building still exists).

His most unusual work is the tomb of Col Edward Cheney which depicts him on his dying horse at Waterloo.

He died in Rome on 8 January 1860. He is buried in the Protestant Cemetery, Rome  often said to be one of the most beautiful cemeteries in the world. It is noted that he sculpted many of the monuments therein. Here he shares company such as Keats and Shelley.

Family

His first wife, Lydia, died in 1838 or soon after. He lost two daughters in the cholera epidemic of 1838. In 1841 in Livorno, Joseph married Anna Drew, daughter of William Drew of  Mangotsfield.

Known works

Samson (1805) exhibited at RA
Jacob Wrestling the Angel (1819) n/k
Head of Bacchante (1820) Chatsworth House
Sisyphus (1821) n/k
Bust of William Hogarth (1824) for Sir Thomas Lawrence
Dying Spartacus (DNK) Soane Museum, London
Little Red Riding Hood - Victoria and Albert Museum, London
Greyhound with Puppies (1825) previously at Normanhurst Court
Bust of Benjamin Gott his father (1828) Leeds art Gallery
Pug and Cat (1828) for the Earl of Shrewsbury
Bust of George Banks (1828) Leeds Art Gallery
Sleeping Venus (1830) purchased by Sir Thomas Lawrence
Family Group: Man, Woman and two Children (1830) purchased by Sir Thomas Lawrence
Female at her Bath (1830) purchased by Sir Thomas Lawrence
Boy and Greyhound (1831) for Earl Cadogan
Seated statue of William Ewart (1832) St James' Chapel in Liverpool
Bust of William Gott his younger brother (1834) Leeds Art Gallery
Ruth Gleaning (1855) n/k
Bust of Benjamin Gott (1856) for Leeds Literary Society
Bust of Christopher Columbus (DNK) Capitoline Museum in Rome
Bust of Ariadne (DNK) at Chatsworth House
Bust of John Barran (DNK) Leeds Art Gallery

Monuments
Monument to Lady Mary Williams in Walton-on-Thames Parish Church (1824)
Monument to Thomas Fairfax in Gilling Parish Church (1828)
Monument to Thomas Lloyd (1828) in Leeds Parish Church
Memorial to 5 year old Emily Cadogan in Durham Cathedral (1830)
Monument to Mary and Samuel Hartley in Bradford Cathedral (1833)
Tomb of William Sharp in Bradford Cathedral (1835)
Tomb of his father Benjamin Gott in Armley Parish Church (1840)
Tomb of Jonathan Ackroyd in All Saints Chapel in Halifax (1847)
Monument to Col. Edward Cheney of the Scots Greys, famed for having four horses killed under him at Waterloo in Gaddesby Parish Church (1848)

References
 

1785 births
1860 deaths
British sculptors
People from Yorkshire